79a Squadriglia was one of Italy's first fighter squadrons. It served in combat during World War I from 13 January 1917 though war's end. It was credited with 47 aerial victories.

History
79a Squadriglia of the Corpo Aeronautico Militare was one of Italy's original fighter squadrons. It was founded in November 1916 at the Central Flying School in Arcade, Italy. On 13 January 1917, it was deployed to Istrana, with its area of operations being the Asiago Plateau near the ongoing Battles of the Isonzo. The new unit flew its first combat mission on 20 January 1917.

On 28 March 1917, 3a Sezione was detached for city defense duties. On 10 April 1917, the squadron was attached to 10o Gruppo. A month later, it was transferred to 7o Gruppo. On 2 June 1917, Antonio Reali scored his first aerial victory for the squadron's initial success.

On 3 December 1917, the squadron was posted to the 15o Gruppo. In June 1918, it was assigned to the Massia da Caccia (Fighter Mass) before passing to control of the 23o Gruppo. The squadron served through war's end. Its wartime record was 4,411 combat sorties flown, with 47 victories achieved in 227 aerial combats. The squadron had suffered five killed.

Commanding officers
 Capitano Francesco Chimirri: November 1916 until injured in takeoff accident on 15 June 1917
 Tenente (later Capitano) Cesare Bartoletti
 Tenente (later Capitano) Umberto Mazzini: 3 December 1917 - 3 September 1918
 Tenente Eugenio Mossi (temporary): 3 September 1918 - 3 October 1918
 Capitano Arturo Freddi Cavallotti: 3 October 1918 to war's end

Duty stations
 Arcade, Italy: November 1916
 Istrana: 20 January 1917
 Nove di Bassano: 2 November 1917
 San Lucia: March 1918

Notable members
 Marziale Cerutti
 Antonio Reali
 Giovanni Nicelli
 Attilio Imolesi

Aircraft

Squadron insignia was a silhouette of a black female wolf looking forward along the fuselage

 Nieuport 11
 Nieuport 17
 Nieuport 27
 Hanriot HD.1

Endnotes

References
 Franks, Norman; Guest, Russell; Alegi, Gregory.  Above the War Fronts: The British Two-seater Bomber Pilot and Observer Aces, the British Two-seater Fighter Observer Aces, and the Belgian, Italian, Austro-Hungarian and Russian Fighter Aces, 1914–1918: Volume 4 of Fighting Airmen of WWI Series: Volume 4 of Air Aces of WWI. Grub Street, 1997. , .

Italian Air Force
Military units and formations of Italy in World War I
Military units and formations established in 1916
1916 establishments in Italy
Squadriglie of Italy